Jackson Ramsay (born 20 November 1994) is a former professional Australian rules footballer who played for the Collingwood Football Club in the Australian Football League (AFL). He was recruited by the club with draft pick #38 in the 2012 AFL Draft. He made his debut in Round 22, 2014, against Greater Western Sydney at Spotless Stadium, following the previous round's injury crisis. After the match he was mentioned as one of the outstanding younger players of the team by the coach Nathan Buckley. He was delisted by Collingwood at the conclusion of the 2017 season.

Statistics
 Statistics are correct to the end of the 2017 season

|- style="background-color: #eaeaea"
! scope="row" style="text-align:center" | 2013
|  || 31 || 0 || — || — || — || — || — || — || — || — || — || — || — || — || — || —
|- 
! scope="row" style="text-align:center" | 2014
|  || 31 || 2 || 0 || 0 || 14 || 8 || 22 || 5 || 7 || 0.0 || 0.0 || 7.0 || 4.0 || 11.0 || 2.5 || 3.5
|- style="background-color: #eaeaea"
! scope="row" style="text-align:center" | 2015
|  || 31 || 5 || 0 || 0 || 36 || 42 || 78 || 8 || 18 || 0.0 || 0.0 || 7.2 || 8.4 || 15.6 || 1.6 || 3.6
|- 
! scope="row" style="text-align:center" | 2016
|  || 31 || 2 || 0 || 0 || 24 || 18 || 42 || 14 || 5 || 0.0 || 0.0 || 12.0 || 9.0 || 21.0 || 7.0 || 2.5
|- style="background-color: #eaeaea"
! scope="row" style="text-align:center" | 2017
|  || 31 || 8 || 0 || 1 || 54 || 76 || 130 || 19 || 25 || 0.0 || 0.1 || 6.8 || 9.5 || 16.3 || 2.4 || 3.1
|- class="sortbottom"
! colspan=3| Career
! 17
! 0
! 1
! 128
! 144
! 272
! 46
! 55
! 0.0
! 0.1
! 7.5
! 8.5
! 16.0
! 2.7
! 3.2
|}

References

External links

1994 births
Living people
Collingwood Football Club players
Australian rules footballers from Western Australia
East Perth Football Club players